Scott Harrington (born December 24, 1963) is an American former auto racing driver, formerly active in the Indy Racing League and sportscar racing. He is now a private racing driver coach.

Biography
Harrington was born in Louisville, Kentucky and attended the University of Louisville. Starting out on two wheels, Harrington won a number of championships and achieved much success in the world of AMA Motocross and Supercross.  In 1986 Sports Car Magazine picked Harrington as one of the three most promising drivers in the U.S.  He was a multiple race winner in Toyota Formula Atlantic, finishing third in the 1988 championship despite running the uncompetitive Ralt chassis. He was the only person ever to win a race in the 1988 Ralt. From 1992 through 1994, Harrington had much success in the SCCA Can-Am series. During his tenure in the series, he won more races than any other driver.  He won the 1992 championship and scored race wins in every season.

An accomplished open wheel racer who made a single CART start in 1989, Harrington made a last second Bump Day run to qualify for the first IRL-sanctioned Indianapolis 500 in 1996. In 1999 he ran a full IRL season with his own team and had numerous top ten finishes, including a top five finish at Phoenix International Raceway, at the time the highest finishing position for the Infiniti engine. Despite failing to qualify for the Indy 500 and suffering serious injuries at Texas 1 (broken left tibia, right fibula, right foot and three ribs) he won the Rookie of the Year honors by a slim margin over Robby McGehee. Harrington attempted to qualify for seven different Indy 500 races but only succeeded once, in his second attempt in 1996. In 1998 he was well on his way to a top qualifying position when he suffered a blown engine that ended his month as the team had no backup. He had a best IRL finish of fourth at Phoenix in 1999 and had a total of 14 series starts, which is the fewest total starts by any IRL Rookie of the Year. Never being one to be short on speed, his bad luck at the Speedway was well known as he won the Jigger award for his bad luck. Harrington is also the only person to ever compete in Formula Atlantic, the original Indy Lights Series, the Infiniti Pro Series, the CART Indy Car Series and the IRL Indy Car Series.

His career was affected by arrests and convictions for driving while intoxicated. Harrington is also one of the few American drivers to compete in the "Big Three" of American motorsports - the Indy 500, the 24 Hours of Daytona and the 12 Hours of Sebring. Harrington also competed in the SVRA celebrity Pro-Am in 2014, 2015, 2016, 2017 and 2018. He finished 9th of the 33 starters in 2015 and in 2018 was on the podium with a second-place finish in AP. Harrington is one of the original instructors at the Mid-Ohio school, a position he still holds today (August 2022).

After retiring from active driving, Harrington has achieved success in his driver coaching business, including coaching Highcroft Racing factory Acura team Championship winning owner-driver Duncan Dayton and Mike Miserandino, who has won four national championships in a row. In 2017, two of his customers won again at the SCCA Runoffs, Mike Miserandino won his fifth National title with Scott's coaching and Max Gee won his first with Scott on board, coaching him to his first national championship. His latest driver, Jacob Abel, won two of the three F3 Americas races at the Road Atlanta round. He also competes in a number of vintage endurance races every year. In 2014 his vintage coaching customer Bill Abel won a national championship at the SVRA National Championship at the Circuit of the Americas. In addition to his testing and training work, Harrington does promotional and testing work for various manufacturers.
 
Harrington currently lives in Indianapolis with his wife Marsie and his young son.

Racing record

SCCA National Championship Runoffs

American open-wheel racing results

CART Series
(key) (Races in bold indicate pole position)

IndyCar Series

Indianapolis 500

References

External links
 Racing Reference.Info 
 motorsport.com

1963 births
Atlantic Championship drivers
Indianapolis 500 drivers
Indy Lights drivers
IndyCar Series drivers
IndyCar Series team owners
24 Hours of Daytona drivers
Living people
Racing drivers from Louisville, Kentucky
SCCA National Championship Runoffs participants
AFS Racing drivers
American Spirit Team Johansson drivers